Blood and Fire is a 1945 Swedish drama film directed by Anders Henrikson. It was entered into the 1946 Cannes Film Festival.

Cast
 Anders Henrikson as Thomas Hell
 Sonja Wigert as Lilli
 George Fant as Herman Nilsson
 Inga Waern as Anna
 Karin Alexandersson as Maria
 Douglas Håge as Male Customer
 Carl-Gunnar Wingård as The Officer
 Birgitta Arman as Greta
 Henrik Schildt as Gurra
 Ninni Löfberg as Svea
 Gösta Ericsson as Nisse
 Håkan Jahnberg as The Doctor

References

External links
 
 

1945 films
1945 drama films
Swedish drama films
1940s Swedish-language films
Swedish black-and-white films
Films directed by Anders Henrikson
1940s Swedish films